Yanbian (Chosŏn'gŭl: , Yeonbyeon), officially known as the Yanbian Korean Autonomous Prefecture, is an autonomous prefecture in the east of Jilin Province, China. Yanbian is bordered to the north by Heilongjiang Province, on the west by Jilin's Baishan City and Jilin City, on the south by North Korea's North Hamgyong Province and on the east by Primorsky Krai in Russia. Yanbian is designated as a Korean autonomous prefecture due to the large number of ethnic Koreans living in the region.

The prefecture has an important Balhae archaeological site: the Ancient Tombs at Longtou Mountain, which includes the Mausoleum of Princess Jeonghyo.

History
In the Ming dynasty, Yanbian was governed by the Jianzhou Guard and in the late Qing dynasty the area was divided into the Yanji and Hunchun subprefectures. From 1644 to the 1800s the Manchurian administrators of the Qing state attempted to separate Northeast China, politically and ethnographically, into a "Manchuria" to which they could retreat in case an ethnically Han Chinese dynasty regained control over China. However, this effort failed because of the trading and agricultural opportunities available to Han Chinese migrants in the northeast region which made it profitable to evade the rules, as well as later Qing relaxation of the same rules to discourage Russian encroachment.

In the late 19th century, Korean immigrants migrated en masse from the Korean Peninsula to China. After the foundation of the Republic of China, a second wave arrived. Of the 2 million ethnic Koreans in Manchuria at the time of the communist takeover, 1.2 million remained in the region after the end of World War II. Many participated in the Chinese Civil War, most on the side of the Chinese communists. When the civil war was over, the new Chinese government gave these Koreans their own autonomous region in 1952. Yanbian was upgraded to an ethnic autonomous prefecture in 1955.

Korean (Joseon) migration into Northeast China began in significant numbers in the last quarter of the 19th century and was mainly motivated by economic hardship on the Korean side of the border. After the Japanese annexed Korea in 1910, a small but significant number of migrants also came to Manchuria for political reasons.

In 1952, the Korean migrants comprised some 60% of the local population, but by 2000 that was down to 32%. The Chinese authorities subsidize Korean language schools and publications, but also take measures to prevent an emergence of Korean irredentism in the area. From the late 1990s, the Koreans have assimilated into mainstream Chinese culture with increasing speed, often switching to daily use of Chinese and choosing to attend Chinese-language schools.

Geography

 Geographic coordinates: 41° 59' 47" – 44° 30' 42" N, 127° 27' 43" – 131° 18' 33" E
 Total border length: 
 With North Korea: 
 With Russia: 

Mountains that are in the prefecture are:

 Changbai Mountains (central range)
 Zhangguangcai Range
 Harba Peak
 Peony Peak
 Old Master Peak
 Nangang Mountain Range

There have been over 40 types of minerals and 50 kinds of metals – including gold, lead, zinc, copper, silver, manganese and mercury – discovered near or in the mountains.

The average land height is 500 metres above sea level.

Main rivers include:

 Songhua River
 Mudan River (Peony River)
 Tumen River
 Gaya River (branch of the Tumen)
 Hunchun River

The rivers sustain 28 running water processing facilities. They created basins, which are suitable for agricultural uses, like rice paddies and bean farms.

Administration

The prefecture is subdivided into eight county-level divisions: six county-level cities and two counties:

The above counties and cities are divided into 642 villages.

Transportation

Railways include:
 Chang-Tu Line
 Mu-Tu Line
 Chao-Kai Line
 Yangchuan-Shantun Line
 Tumen-Hunchun Railway: under construction

There are four airports.

Demographics
Ethnic composition:
2,271,600 (2010)
64.55% Han Chinese
32.45% Korean
2.52% Manchu
0.28% Hui
0.13% Mongols
Growth rate 0.4%.

Population density: .

As on the Korean peninsula, the most common surname among Yanbian Koreans is Kim (Jin [] in Chinese). Many emigrated from Korea during the 19th century and again during the Japanese occupation.

Between 1952 and 2002, the Yanbian Korean Autonomous Prefecture had among the highest rates of urbanization at 55.6%, 20 percentage points greater than the provincial average (31.3%) and 25 more than the national average (26.5%).

Education

Colleges and universities:
 Yanbian University, which uses both Chinese and Korean as instruction mediums.
 Yanbian University of Science and Technology

International schools:
 Yanbian International Academy
 Korean International School in Yanbian

Culture

Both Mandarin Chinese and Korean are used as official languages in Yanbian.

The Museum of Yanbian Korean Autonomous Prefecture was planned in 1960, and constructed in 1982. It contains over 10,000 exhibits, including 11 first-level artifacts. The exhibits' labels and explanations are bilingual in Korean and Chinese and tour guides are also available in both languages.

Tourism

There are seven public parks in Yanbian's green space (18% of whole prefecture), including:
Yanji People's Park
Youth Lake Park

Also popular among locals during holidays and festivities.

 Baekdusan

Nature and environment

Over 70% are originally forest in the prefecture, so there is a rich diversity of life.

 1,460 species of native animals
 250 species of native plants.

Sports

Yanbian Korean Autonomous Prefecture is an important region for Chinese football. Over 50 years, more than 40 footballers have been selected by the Chinese national football team.

The first professional football team in this prefecture is Jilin Three Stars Football Club. From 1994 to 2000, this club had played each year in the top Chinese football league. In 2000, they were relegated from the top league. Because of poor economic conditions the club was sold to Lucheng Group in Zhejiang Province.

The Yanbian Football Club plays in the 32,000-seater Hailanjiang Stadium in the Chinese Super League, the top tier of the Chinese football league system.

In 2016, Yanbian Football Club was sponsored by Shenzhen Funde Group when they got the permission of Chinese Super League, since they acquired the 1st place in the Chinese Second League in 2015.

See also

Changbai Korean Autonomous County

References

Works cited

Further reading

External links 

 Official government website 
 Official government Tourism website
 Yanbian Office in Korea 
 Yanbian Korean Autonomous Prefecture: by the Information Office of Jilin Provincial Government
 A map labeled in Chinese written in the list in the "Administration" section

 
Prefecture-level divisions of Jilin
Autonomous prefectures of the People's Republic of China
Koreans in China
Korean-speaking countries and territories